"Man With a Vision" is a song written by John Parr, Keith McFarlane and Simon LeFevre, which was first recorded and released by Seven as their second non-album single in 1990. Parr later released his own version as the title track to his 1992 album.

Seven version
"Man with a Vision" was the second and final single to be released by Seven. Like their previous single "Inside Love", it was produced by Parr. Having signed with Polydor Records in 1989, Seven would release two singles for the label, with "Man with a Vision" being the second. It peaked at No. 91 in the UK and remained in the charts for two weeks. A promotional video was filmed to promote the single.

The lack of success of "Inside Love" and "Man With a Vision" led to the band being dropped by Polydor. The band split shortly after due to a series of internal struggles and arguments.

"Man with a Vision" was released by Polydor in the UK only on 7" vinyl, 12" vinyl and CD. The B-side, "Just Close Your Eyes", was featured on all formats of the single. An extended version of "Man with a Vision" was featured on the 12" and CD formats, while the CD version featured an additional track "Stranger (In The Night)".

Track listing
 7" single
 "Man With a Vision" – 4:06
 "Just Close Your Eyes" – 2:51

 12" single
 "Man With a Vision (Extended Version)" – 5:59
 "Man With a Vision (7" Version)" – 4:06
 "Just Close Your Eyes" – 2:51

 CD single
 "Man With a Vision (7" Version)" – 4:06
 "Just Close Your Eyes" – 2:51
 "Man With a Vision (Extended Version)" – 5:59
 "Stranger (In The Night)" - 4:53

Chart performance

John Parr version

"Man with a Vision" was later recorded by Parr and released in 1992 on his third studio album Man With a Vision. The song was also the lead single from the album. A promotional video was filmed to promote the single.

"Man with a Vision" was released on 7" vinyl, 12" vinyl and CD in the UK by Music For Nations. It was also issued in Switzerland on 7" and CD formats by Blue Martin Records, on 7" vinyl in Sweden/Germany by Generation Records, and CD in Germany by Edelton. The B-side "Forever's Not For Everyone" was exclusive to the single. The UK 12" vinyl and all CD formats featured the additional track "Come Out Fightin'", which was included on Man with a Vision.

Track listings
 7" single
 "Man With a Vision" - 4:00
 "Forever's Not For Everyone" - 4:37

 12" single
 "Man With a Vision" - 4:00
 "Forever's Not For Everyone" - 4:37
 "Come Out Fightin'" - 5:14

 CD Single
 "Man With a Vision" - 4:00
 "Forever's Not For Everyone" - 4:37
 "Come Out Fightin'" - 5:14

References

1990 singles
1992 singles
John Parr songs
Songs written by John Parr
1990 songs
Polydor Records singles